Vittjar is the eleventh full-length album by progressive rock band Kaipa.

Track listing

Personnel
 Patrik Lundström - vocals
 Aleena Gibson - vocals
 Per Nilsson - electric and acoustic guitars
 Morgan Ågren - drums
 Hans Lundin - electric and acoustic keyboards, vocals
 Jonas Reingold - electric basses
 Fredrik Lindqvist - recorders and whistles (tracks 1, 2, 3, & 7)
 Elin Rubinsztein - violin (tracks 2, 4, 6, & 7)

2012 albums
Kaipa albums